Barkhad is a given name. Notable people with the name include:

Barkhad Abdi (born 1985), Somali-American actor and director
Barkhad Awale Adan (1950?–2010), Somali journalist
Barkhad Ali Salah (died 2016), Somali politician and historian